Hong Sung-woo (20 February 1940 – 2 December 2021) was a South Korean politician. A member of the Democratic Justice Party, he served in the National Assembly from 1979 to 1988.

References

1940 births
2021 deaths
20th-century South Korean politicians
21st-century South Korean people
People from Anseong
Democratic Justice Party politicians
Members of the National Assembly (South Korea)